The 2017–18 Quinnipiac Bobcats men's basketball team represented Quinnipiac University during the 2017–18 NCAA Division I men's basketball season. The Bobcats, led by first-year head coach Baker Dunleavy, played their home games at TD Bank Sports Center in Hamden, Connecticut as members of the Metro Atlantic Athletic Conference. They finished the season 12–21 overall, 7–11 in MAAC play to finish in a tie for seventh place. As the No. 7 seed at the MAAC tournament, they defeated No. 10 seed Siena and upset No. 2 seed Canisius to advance to the semifinals where they lost to No. 6 seed Fairfield.

Previous season
The Bobcats finished the 2016–17 season 10–21, 7–13 in MAAC play to finish in eighth place. They lost in the first round of the MAAC tournament to Niagara.

On March 7, 2017, head coach Tom Moore was fired. He finished at Quinnipiac with a ten-year record of 162–146. On March 27, Villanova assistant coach Baker Dunleavy was hired as the Bobcats next head coach.

Roster

Schedule and results

|-
!colspan=9 style=| Non-conference regular season

|-
!colspan=9 style=| MAAC regular season

|-
!colspan=9 style=| MAAC tournament

References

Quinnipiac Bobcats men's basketball seasons
Quinnipiac
Quinnipiac Bobcats
Quinnipiac Bobcats